Adéla Pivoňková is a former Czech football midfielder, who played for Sparta Prague in the Czech First Division.

She was a member of the Czech national team. She made her debut for the national team on 26 June 2008 in a match against Belarus.

Pivoňková was voted talent of the year at the 2007 Czech Footballer of the Year (women).

References

1991 births
Living people
Czech women's footballers
Czech Republic women's international footballers
People from Jilemnice
Women's association football midfielders
AC Sparta Praha (women) players
Czech Women's First League players
Sportspeople from the Liberec Region